Mulholland or Mullholland is a surname. Anglicized form of Gaelic Ó Maolchalann ‘descendant of Maolchalann’, a personal name meaning ‘chief of the calends’,

Notable people with the surname include:
Alan Mulholland, Irish Gaelic footballer and manager
Bob Mulholland, "senior advisor and longtime chief spokesperson" of the California Democratic Party
Clara Mulholland (1849–1934), Irish writer
Colm Mulholland, Irish Gaelic footballer
Dale Mulholland, former US professional soccer player
Danielle Mulholland, politician, Australia
Frank Mulholland, Lord Mulholland PC KC (born 1959), Scottish judge
Greg Mulholland, Liberal Democrat politician in the United Kingdom
Inez Mullholland, suffragist, labor lawyer, World War I correspondent, and public speaker
Jimmy Mulholland (born 1938), Scottish footballer
Joe H. Mulholland, American politician
Joan Trumpauer Mulholland, Civil Rights / integration activist
John Mulholland (disambiguation), human name disambiguation page
Peter Mulholland (c.1953–2021), Australian rugby league football coach
Robert Mulholland, politician and businessman of Ontario
Rosanne Mulholland, Brazilian actress
St. Clair Augustine Mulholland, American Civil War colonel
Terry Mulholland, former Major League Baseball pitcher
Tom Mulholland (disambiguation), human name disambiguation page
William Mulholland, civil engineer in Los Angeles circa 1900

See also
Mulholland Drive, Los Angeles
Mulholland Madness
Mulholland Drive (film)
Mulholland Falls
"Mullholland", the seventh episode of the first season of Kipo and the Age of Wonderbeasts.